Indian Summers is a British drama television series that began airing on Channel 4 on 15 February 2015. The show details the events of summers spent at Simla, in the foothills of the Himalayas, by a group of the British governing and trading community at the time of the British Raj. The first series is set in 1932. It was broadcast in several countries subsequently.

The show was renewed for a second and final series on 1 March 2015. The second and final series is set in 1935 and began airing on 13 March 2016. Although initially planned by producers for five series, on 25 April 2016 it was announced that the show would not be renewed for a third series due to poor ratings and strong competition in its timeslot.

Cast 

 Henry Lloyd-Hughes as Ralph Whelan 
 Nikesh Patel as Aafrin Dalal 
 Julie Walters as Cynthia Coffin 
 Patrick Malahide as Lord Willingdon 
 Jemima West as Alice Whelan 
 Roshan Seth as Darius Dalal 
 Lillete Dubey as Roshana Dalal 
 Aysha Kala as Sooni Dalal 
 Alexander Cobb as Ian McLeod 
 Fiona Glascott as Sarah Raworth 
 Craig Parkinson as Dougie Raworth 
 Olivia Grant as Madeleine Mathers 
 Amber Rose Revah as Leena Prasad 
 Rick Warden as Ronnie Keane 
 Tanmay Dhanania as Naseem Ali Khan 
 Ashna Rabheru as Shamshad Dalal 
 Indi Nadarajah as Kaiser 
 Ash Nair as Bhupinder

Series 1
 Ellora Torchia as Sita
 Edward Hogg as Eugene Mathers
 Alyy Khan as Ramu Sood
 Daniel Skitch as Shopkeeper
 Anthony Theil as The Coroner

Series 2
 Art Malik as The Maharajah of Amritpur
 Rachel Griffiths as Sirene/Phyllis
 Sugandha Garg as Kaira Das
 Arjun Mathur as Naresh Banerjee
 Blake Ritson as Charlie Havistock

Production 
The series was filmed in Penang, Malaysia, as a stand-in for Simla. Simla was not chosen due to the large number of modern buildings and a monsoon season that would have interfered with filming. Shooting locations included Penang Hill and historic buildings in and around George Town, which share a similar British colonial architectural lineage.

Overview

Series 1 (2015)

Series 2 (2016) 
On 1 March 2015, Channel 4 confirmed that Indian Summers would return for a second and final series in 2016, starring new cast members including Art Malik and Academy Award nominated Rachel Griffiths. The first episode aired on Sunday 13 March 2016. The 10-part series returns to Simla in the summer of 1935, three years after the events of the first series. Paul Rutman, creator and writer of the series, said: "Our story moves forward three years, to a Viceroy’s last summer, a political gamble to stifle Independence and a great reckoning for Ralph, Alice and Aafrin."

Reception 
The first series of Indian Summers received largely positive reviews, gaining a score of 88% on Rotten Tomatoes. At the time, the first episode was Channel 4's highest rating original UK drama in over 20 years. After the first episode aired, The Times described the series as "A work of subtlety, intelligence and some beauty." The Independent wrote "Indian Summers is a fully immersive experience that plunges its audience headlong into 1930s Simla in British-ruled India." The Daily Express said "The opening did not disappoint." In the United States, the San Francisco Chronicle called the series "exemplary" and stated that Rutman had an "exquisite sense of character".

International broadcast
Indian Summers premiered in the United States on PBS on 27 September 2015. It premiered in Australia on BBC First on 16 May 2015 while in New Zealand, it premiered on TVNZ TV One on 7 June 2015. In Estonia, the show premiered on Kanal 2 on 12 July 2015 and on SVT1 in Sweden on 20 June 2015. On 31 May 2015 it premiered on NRK1 in Norway. In Finland, the show premiered on Yle TV1 on 22 November 2017.

References

External links 
 
 Indian Summers at Channel 4

Fiction set in 1932
Fiction set in 1935
2015 British television series debuts
2016 British television series endings
Channel 4 television dramas
English-language television shows
Television series set in the 1930s
Television shows set in Shimla
Television shows set in the British Raj